2005 in sports describes the year's events in world sport.

Alpine skiing
 Alpine Skiing World Cup
 Men's overall season champion: Bode Miller (US)
 Women's overall season champion: Anja Pärson (Sweden)

American football
 Super Bowl XXXIX – the New England Patriots (AFC) won 24–21 over the Philadelphia Eagles (NFC)
Location: Alltel Stadium
Attendance: 78,125
MVP: Deion Branch, WR (New England)
 Orange Bowl (2004 season):
 The Southern California Trojans won 55–19 over the Oklahoma Sooners to win the BCS National Championship

Association football
 May 18 – UEFA Cup final – CSKA Moscow became the first Russian club to win a major European club competition, defeating Sporting Lisbon 3–1 at Sporting's home field in Lisbon.
 May 25 – UEFA Champions League final – Liverpool defeated A.C. Milan 3–2 on penalties after a 3–3 draw in Istanbul to win Europe's top prize for the 5th time.
 August 31 – Boca Juniors (Argentina) won the Recopa Sudamericana 2005 4–3 on aggregate over Once Caldas (Colombia). (First leg in Buenos Aires 3–1, second leg in Manizales 1–2)
 December 11 – Opening game of the first FIFA World Club Championship, a six team tournament replacing the former Intercontinental Cup. In the final one week later Brazilian team São Paulo won the competition narrowly beating UEFA Champions Liverpool 1–0.
 December 18 – Boca Juniors defeated UNAM Pumas on penalties after the second leg game for the Copa Sudamericana 2005.
 December 19 – Ronaldinho (Brazil, for male footballer) and Birgit Prinz (Germany, for female footballer) were elected FIFA World Player of the Year.

Australian rules football
 Australian Football League
 The Sydney Swans win the 109th AFL Premiership, defeating West Coast Eagles 8.10 (58) to 7.12 (54), the club's first premiership in 72 years
 Brownlow Medal awarded to Ben Cousins, captain of the West Coast Eagles
 Leigh Matthews Trophy also awarded to Cousins
 Coleman Medal awarded to Fraser Gehrig of St Kilda
 See also Australian Football League season 2005
 2005 Australian Football International Cup won by New Zealand

Athletics
 June 14 – Men's 100 metres – Asafa Powell of Jamaica sets a new world record of 9.77 at the Athens Olympic Stadium.
 June 19 – European Cup
 Men's overall standings – Germany
 Women's overall standings – Russia
 August – World Championships held in Helsinki
 IAAF Golden League – Russian triple jumper Tatyana Lebedeva is the sole winner of the US$1 million jackpot divided among all athletes who win their event at each of six designated meets.
 December 13 – The Court of Arbitration for Sport bans American Tim Montgomery for two years in a case stemming from his involvement with the controversial "sports nutrition" center BALCO. Although Montgomery never tested positive for drugs, CAS found the circumstantial evidence against him overwhelming. It also struck all his results since 2001 from the records, including a then world-record time of 9.78.

Baseball
 October 22 – 2005 Japan Series – The Chiba Lotte Marines sweep the Hanshin Tigers 4 games to 0.
 October 26 – 2005 MLB World Series – The Chicago White Sox sweep the Houston Astros 4 games to 0 to win the World Series for the first time since 1917.

Basketball
 NBA Finals – San Antonio Spurs win their third NBA title in the past seven years, defeating the Detroit Pistons in the first seven-game NBA Finals in eleven years.
 Men's Division I – North Carolina defeats Illinois, 75–70, in the Championship Game. It is Tar Heels coach Roy Williams's first national title.
 Women's Division I – Baylor defeats Michigan State, 84–62, in the final. It is the first Women's National Title game in several years to not involve either Tennessee or UConn. Baylor coach Kim Mulkey-Robertson becomes the first woman to win NCAA Division I basketball titles as a player and coach.
 Euroleague – Maccabi Tel Aviv successfully defends the Euroleague title, defeating TAU Cerámica of Spain, 90–78, in the final.
 Chinese Basketball Association finals – defending champions Guangdong Southern Tigers defeat the Jiangsu Dragons 3 games to 2 in the best-of-five Chinese Basketball Association finals.
 National Basketball League (Australia) – Sydney Kings defeated the Wollongong Hawks, 3–0, in a best-of-five finals series.
 Bj League, a professional basketball league in Japan, predecessor for B League of Japan, a first game held on November 5.

Bowling
 February 20 – Chris Barnes wins the 62nd US Open
 April 3 – Patrick Allen wins the PBA Denny's World Championship
 April 10 – Steve Jaros wins the PBA Dexter Tournament of Champions
 Patrick Allen is named the Player of the Year for 2004–2005
 November 20 – Mike Scroggins wins the USBC Masters

Boxing
 May 7 – Diego Corrales defeats José Luis Castillo by 10th-round knockout, for the WBO-WBC lightweight title unification.  Both men were exchanging a brutal amount of punishment throughout the fight, before a dramatic tenth round in which Corrales scored a TKO after getting knocked down twice.  The fight was highly regarded as one of the greatest of all-time and won Ring Magazine fight of the year.
 July 16 – Jermain Taylor, 2000 US Olympic Boxing bronze medalist, defeats Bernard Hopkins for the undisputed Middleweight Title ending Hopkins' 10 year title reign. Hopkins made 20 successful title defenses before losing to Taylor, the current record in the middleweight division, Carlos Monzón is second with 14 successful defenses.
 13 to November 20 – World Amateur Boxing Championships held in Mianyang, People's Republic of China

Canadian football
 November 27 – the Edmonton Eskimos win the 93rd Grey Cup game, defeating the Montreal Alouettes 38–35 at BC Place Stadium in Vancouver.

Cricket
 January 10 – ICC World XI (344 for 8) beat the ACC Asian XI (232) by 112 runs to win the first of two scheduled one-day internationals for the World Cricket Tsunami Appeal; the second was never played. It is the first time an ODI has been played that has not been between two cricketing nations.
 January 10 – Bangladesh beat Zimbabwe by 226 runs to record their first ever Test match victory.
 July 2 – England and Australia tie the deciding NatWest Series trophy match at Lord's Cricket Ground.
 August 11 – Shane Warne becomes the first bowler to take 600 Test wickets.
 September 12 – England win The Ashes.

Cycling
Road bicycle racing
 Giro d'Italia – Maglia rosa (Overall winner): Paolo Savoldelli (Italy, Discovery Channel Team)
 Tour de France won by Lance Armstrong, his record-setting seventh consecutive title.
Cyclo-cross
 UCI Cyclo-cross World Championships
 Men's Competition – Sven Nys
 Women's Competition – Hanka Kupfernagel

Field hockey
 Men's Champions Trophy: Australia
 Men's Champions Challenge: Argentina
 Women's Champions Trophy: Netherlands
 Women's Champions Challenge: New Zealand

Figure skating
 World Figure Skating Championships
 Men's champion: Stéphane Lambiel, Switzerland
 Ladies' champion: Irina Slutskaya, Russia
 Pair skating champions: Tatiana Totmianina and Maxim Marinin, Russia
 Ice dancing champions: Tatiana Navka and Roman Kostomarov, Russia

Floorball
 Women's World Floorball Championships
 Champion: Switzerland
 Men's under-19 World Floorball Championships
 Champion: Sweden
 European Cup
 Men's champion: SV Wiler-Ersigen
 Women's champion: RA Rychenberg

Gaelic Athletic Association
 April 16 – The annual congress of the Gaelic Athletic Association votes to open up Croke Park and allow soccer and rugby to be played there under certain circumstances. It is expected that this will pave the way for the Republic of Ireland national football team and the Irish national rugby union team to use Croke Park during the redevelopment of their home ground, Lansdowne Road.
 Camogie
 All-Ireland Camogie Champion: Cork
 National Camogie League: Galway
 Gaelic football
 All-Ireland Senior Football Championship – Tyrone 1–16 died Kerry 2–10
 National Football League – Armagh 1–21 died Wexford 1–14
 Tommy Murphy Cup – Tipperary 3–10 died Wexford 0–15
 Ladies' Gaelic football
 All-Ireland Senior Football Champion: Cork
 National Football League: Cork
 Hurling
 All-Ireland Senior Hurling Championship – Cork 1–21 died Galway 1–16
 Liam MacCarthy Cup – Cork
 Christy Ring Cup – Westmeath 1–23 died Down 2–18
 Nicky Rackard Cup – London 5–8 died Louth 1–5
 National Hurling League – Kilkenny beat Clare

Gliding
 World Gliding Championships (Women's), Klix, Germany
 15-metre Class Winner: Mette Pedersen, Denmark; Glider: Alexander Schleicher ASW 27B
 Standard Class Winner: Jana Veprekova, Czech Republic; Glider: Rolladen-Schneider LS8-b
 Club Class Winner: Hana Vokrinkova, Czech Republic; Glider: Schempp-Hirth Standard Cirrus
 World Gliding Championships (Junior), Husbands Bosworth, United Kingdom
 Standard Class Winner: Mark Parker, Great Britain; Glider: Rolladen-Schneider LS8
 Club Class Winner: Christoph Nacke, Germany; Glider: Rolladen-Schneider LS1

Golf
Men's professional
 Major Championships
 Masters Tournament – Tiger Woods defeated fellow American Chris DiMarco at the first playoff hole to claim his 4th Masters title and his 9th major.
 U.S. Open – Michael Campbell
 British Open – Tiger Woods
 PGA Championship – Phil Mickelson
 PGA Tour money leader – Tiger Woods won $10,628,024
Men's amateur
 British Amateur – Brian McElhinney
 U.S. Amateur – Edoardo Molinari
 European Amateur – Marius Thorp
Women's professional
 Kraft Nabisco Championship – Annika Sörenstam won her eighth major
 LPGA Championship – Annika Sörenstam
 U.S. Women's Open – Birdie Kim earned what became her only LPGA Tour win.
 Women's British Open – Jeong Jang
 LPGA Tour money leader – Annika Sörenstam won $2,588,240

Handball
 2005 World Men's Handball Championship: Spain

Horse racing
Steeplechases
 Cheltenham Gold Cup – Kicking King
 Grand National – Hedgehunter
Flat races
 Australia – Melbourne Cup won by Makybe Diva for the third time in succession
 Canada – Queen's Plate won by Wild Desert
 Dubai – Dubai World Cup won by Roses in May	
 France – Prix de l'Arc de Triomphe won by Hurricane Run
 Ireland – Irish Derby Stakes won by Hurricane Run
 Japan
 Deep Impact won the Satsuki Sho (Japanese 2,000 Guineas), Tokyo Yushun (Japanese Derby), and Kikuka Sho (Japanese St. Leger) to become the first horse since 1994 to win the Japanese Triple Crown.
 Japan Cup won by Alkaased
 English Triple Crown Races:
 2,000 Guineas Stakes – Footstepsinthesand
 The Derby – Motivator
 St. Leger Stakes – Scorpion
 United States Triple Crown Races:
 Kentucky Derby – Giacomo
 Preakness Stakes – Afleet Alex
 Belmont Stakes – Afleet Alex
 Breeders' Cup World Thoroughbred Championships:
 Breeders' Cup Classic – Saint Liam
 Breeders' Cup Distaff – Pleasant Home
 Breeders' Cup Filly & Mare Turf – Intercontinental
 Breeders' Cup Juvenile – Stevie Wonderboy
 Breeders' Cup Juvenile Fillies – Folklore
 Breeders' Cup Mile – Artie Schiller
 Breeders' Cup Sprint – Silver Train
 Breeders' Cup Turf – Shirocco

Ice hockey
 February 16 – the 2004–05 NHL season was canceled by league commissioner Gary Bettman. This was the first time that a North American professional sports league had to cancel a season due to a labor dispute.
 May 29 – Memorial Cup – London Knights defeat Rimouski Océanic 4–0 to win the Memorial Cup.
 June 1 – Kelly Cup – Trenton Titans defeat Florida Everblades 4 games to 2 to win the Kelly Cup.
 June 10 – Calder Cup – Philadelphia Phantoms defeat Chicago Wolves 4 games to 0 to win the Calder Cup.
 The Philadelphia Flyers top two minor league affiliates, the ECHL Trenton Titans and the AHL Philadelphia Phantoms, both win their respective championship series.
 July 22 – the 2004–05 NHL lockout ends when a new collective bargaining agreement between the NHL and NHLPA is reached.

Lacrosse
Major League Lacrosse (USA)
 Baltimore Bayhawks defeated Long Island Lizards 15–9 to win the Steinfeld Cup.
 MLL announces four expansion teams to start play in the 2006 season and create a Western Conference: Chicago, Denver, Los Angeles and San Francisco.
National Lacrosse League
 The Toronto Rock defeat the Arizona Sting to win the Champion's Cup.
 Les Bartley, former coach and GM of the Toronto Rock, dies later that week.
 Gary Gait, of the Colorado Mammoth, retires along with his twin brother Paul Gait ending an era of lacrosse.
NCAA Division I (US Collegiate)
 Johns Hopkins University obtains the No. 1 seed in the post-season tournament, and wins the NCAA Men's Lacrosse Championship in Philadelphia on May 30 to go unbeaten.
 Northwestern University wins their first Division I NCAA Women's Lacrosse Championship.
European lacrosse
 November 10 – Austrian Lacrosse Association (ÖLAXV) is founded.

Mixed martial arts
The following is a list of major noteworthy MMA events during 2005 in chronological order.

|-
|align=center style="border-style: none none solid solid; background: #e3e3e3"|Date
|align=center style="border-style: none none solid solid; background: #e3e3e3"|Event
|align=center style="border-style: none none solid solid; background: #e3e3e3"|Alternate Name/s
|align=center style="border-style: none none solid solid; background: #e3e3e3"|Location
|align=center style="border-style: none none solid solid; background: #e3e3e3"|Attendance
|align=center style="border-style: none none solid solid; background: #e3e3e3"|PPV Buyrate
|align=center style="border-style: none none solid solid; background: #e3e3e3"|Notes
|-align=center
|February 5
|UFC 51: Super Saturday
|
| Las Vegas, Nevada, USA
|11,072
|105,000
|
|-align=center
|February 20
|Pride 29: Fists of Fire
|
| Saitama, Japan
|22,047
|
|
|-align=center
|March 26
|K-1 Hero's 1
|
| Saitama, Japan
|
|
|
|-align=center
|April 3
|Pride Bushido 6
|
| Yokohama, Japan
|
|
|
|-align=center
|April 9
|The Ultimate Fighter 1 Finale
|
| Las Vegas, Nevada, USA
|
|
|
|-align=center
|April 16
|UFC 52: Couture vs. Liddell 2
|
| Las Vegas, Nevada, USA
|14,562
|280,000
|
|-align=center
|April 23
|Pride Total Elimination 2005
|
| Osaka, Japan
|45,423
|
|
|-align=center
|May 7
|Rumble on the Rock 7
|
| Honolulu, Hawaii, USA
|
|
|
|-align=center
|May 22
|Pride Bushido 7
|
| Tokyo, Japan
|
|
|
|-align=center
|June 4
|UFC 53: Heavy Hitters
|
| Atlantic City, New Jersey, USA
|12,000
|90,000
|
|-align=center
|June 26
|Pride Critical Countdown 2005
|
| Saitama, Japan
|
|
|
|-align=center
|July 6
|K-1 Hero's 2
|
| Tokyo, Japan
|
|
|
|-align=center
|July 17
|Pride Bushido 8
|
| Nagoya, Japan
|
|
|
|-align=center
|July 29
|K-1 World Grand Prix 2005 in Hawaii
|
| Honolulu, Hawaii, USA
|
|
|
|-align=center
|August 6
|UFC Ultimate Fight Night
|Ultimate Fight Night
| Las Vegas, Nevada, USA
|
|
|
|-align=center
|August 20
|UFC 54: Boiling Point
|
| Las Vegas, Nevada, USA
|13,520
|150,000
|
|-align=center
|August 28
|Pride Final Conflict 2005
|
| Saitama, Japan
|
|
|
|-align=center
|September 7
|K-1 Hero's 3
|
| Tokyo, Japan
|
|
|
|-align=center
|September 25
|Pride Bushido 9
|
| Tokyo, Japan
|10,775
|
|
|-align=center
|October 3
|UFC Ultimate Fight Night 2
|Ultimate Fight Night 2
| Las Vegas, Nevada, USA
|
|
|
|-align=center
|October 3
|UFC 55: Fury
|
| Uncasville, Connecticut, USA
|8,000
|125,000
|
|-align=center
|October 3
|Pride 30: Starting Over
|Pride 30: Fully Loaded
| Saitama, Japan
|
|
|
|-align=center
|November 5
|The Ultimate Fighter 2 Finale
|
| Las Vegas, Nevada, USA
|
|
|
|-align=center
|November 5
|K-1 Seoul Hero's
|
| Seoul, South Korea
|
|
|
|-align=center
|November 19
|UFC 56: Full Force
|
| Las Vegas, Nevada, USA
|12,000
|200,000
|
|-align=center
|November 26
|K-1 Hero's Lithuania 2005
|
| Vilnius, Lithuania
|
|
|
|-align=center
|December 3
|Cage Rage 14: Punishment
|
| London, England
|
|
|
|-align=center
|December 3
|Pride Shockwave 2005
|
| Saitama, Japan
|49,801
|
|
|-align=center
|December 3
|K-1 PREMIUM 2005 Dynamite!!
|
| Osaka, Japan
|53,025
|
|
|-align=center

Motorsport

Radiosport
 6th High Speed Telegraphy World Championship held in Ohrid, Republic of Macedonia.

Rugby league

 February 4 at Elland Road, Leeds – 2005 World Club Challenge match is won by the Leeds Rhinos who defeated the Bulldogs 39–32 before 37,208
 April 22 at Suncorp Stadium, Brisbane – in the 2005 ANZAC Day Test, Australia defeat New Zealand 32–16 before 40,317
 July 5 at Suncorp Stadium, Brisbane – 2005 State of Origin is won by New South Wales in the third and deciding match of the series against Queensland before 52,436
 August 27 at Millennium Stadium, Cardiff – 2005 Challenge Cup tournament won by Hull F.C. with a 25–24 win over Leeds Rhinos before 74,213
 October 2 at Telstra Stadium, Sydney – 2005 NRL season culminates in the Wests Tigers 30–16 win over the North Queensland Cowboys in the Grand Final before 82,453
 October 15 at Old Trafford, Manchester – Super League X culminates in Bradford Bulls 15–6 win over Leeds Rhinos in the Grand Final before 65,728
 November 26 at Elland Road, Leeds – 2005 Rugby League Tri-Nations tournament culminates in New Zealand's 24–0 win over Australia in the final before 26,534

Rugby union
 110th Six Nations Championship series is won by Wales who complete the Grand Slam
 2005 British & Irish Lions tour to New Zealand – The Lions suffer a 3–0 whitewash to New Zealand, as well as losing to the New Zealand Māori side. It was the first time in 22 years that a Lions side had lost every Test match on tour.
 Tri Nations – New Zealand wins for the 6th time. The All Blacks also picked up the Bledisloe Cup in the process.
 Heineken Cup – Toulouse defeat Stade Français 18–12 in the final.
 Super 12 – The Crusaders defeat the Waratahs 35–25 in the final
 Zurich Premiership (England) – Leicester Tigers win the league, Wasps win the playoffs
 Celtic League – Ospreys
 Top 16 (France) – Biarritz defeat Stade Français 37–34 in the final
 National Provincial Championship (New Zealand): Auckland defeat Otago 39–11 in the final
 Currie Cup (South Africa) – Cheetahs defeat Blue Bulls 29–25 in the final
 In the November Tests, the All Blacks (New Zealand) score a "Grand Slam" by defeating all four Home Nations (Wales, Ireland, England, Scotland) while on tour. This is the first such Grand Slam for a Southern Hemisphere team since Australia did so in 1984, and the first for the All Blacks since 1978.

Snooker
 World Championship – Shaun Murphy beats Matthew Stevens 18–16

Sumo
 Asashōryū Akinori wins all six basho (tournament) in 2005 (a new record) and wins eighty-four bouts (out of ninety) setting a new record for victories in a single year. His seventh straight basho championship is also a new record.

Swimming
 11th World LC Championships held in Montreal
 23rd Summer Universiade held in Izmir, Turkey
 9th European SC Championships held in Trieste, Italy
 Germany wins the most medals (13); Germany and Poland win the most gold medals (5)

Taekwondo
 World Championships held in Madrid, Spain

Tennis
 Australian Open
 Men's Final: Marat Safin defeats Lleyton Hewitt
 Women's Final: Serena Williams defeats Lindsay Davenport
 French Open
 Men's Final: Rafael Nadal defeats Mariano Puerta
 Women's Final: Justine Henin-Hardenne defeats Mary Pierce
 Wimbledon Championships
 Men's Final: Roger Federer defeats Andy Roddick
 Ladies' Final: Venus Williams defeats Lindsay Davenport
 US Open
 Men's Final: Roger Federer defeats Andre Agassi
 Women's Final: Kim Clijsters defeats Mary Pierce

Triathlon
 ITU World Championships held in Gamagōri, Japan

Volleyball
 Men's World League: Brazil
 Women's World Grand Prix: Brazil

Water polo
 2005 FINA Men's World Water Polo Championship: Yugoslavia
 2005 FINA Men's Water Polo World League: Yugoslavia
 2005 FINA Women's World Water Polo Championship: Hungary
 2005 FINA Women's Water Polo World League: Greece

Weightlifting
 World Championships held in Doha, Qatar
 European Championships held in Sofia, Bulgaria

Multi-sport events
 Fourth East Asian Games held in Macau, China
 20th Summer Deaflympics held in Melbourne, Australia
 23rd Southeast Asian Games held in Manila, Philippines
 First Asian Indoor Games held in Bangkok, Thailand
 Seventh World Games held in Duisburg, Germany
 15th Mediterranean Games held in Almería, Spain
 XXIII Summer Universiade held in Izmir, Turkey
 Russia tops the medal table with a total number of 65 medals, including 26 golds.
 XXII Winter Universiade held in Innsbruck, Austria
 Austria tops the medal table with a total number of 21 medals, including 10 golds.

Awards
 Associated Press Male Athlete of the Year – Lance Armstrong, Cycling
 Associated Press Female Athlete of the Year – Annika Sörenstam, LPGA golf

References

 
Sports by year